José Mauricio Parra Perdomo (born 6 February 1990) is a Venezuelan footballer who most recently played for Aragua as a midfielder.

Honours

Club

Deportivo Táchira 
 Venezuelan Primera División (3): 2008, 2009-10, 2010-11

References

External links
 
 
 

1990 births
Living people
People from San Cristóbal, Táchira
Venezuelan footballers
Venezuela international footballers
Association football midfielders
Deportivo Táchira F.C. players
Asociación Civil Deportivo Lara players
Aragua FC players
Llaneros de Guanare players
Venezuelan Primera División players